Michael Markussen (born 9 January 1955) is a Danish former cyclist. He competed at the 1980 Summer Olympics and the 1984 Summer Olympics.

References

External links
 

1955 births
Living people
Danish male cyclists
Olympic cyclists of Denmark
Cyclists at the 1980 Summer Olympics
Cyclists at the 1984 Summer Olympics
People from Roskilde
Sportspeople from Region Zealand